Frederick McMahon Gaige (3 July 1890, Ann Arbor – 20 October 1976, Keystone Heights) was an American entomologist and herpetologist.

Sources

External links
 

1890 births
1976 deaths
American entomologists
American herpetologists
20th-century American zoologists